Mohamed Hadheb Hannachi (born 15 March 1938) is a Tunisian long-distance runner. He competed in the marathon at the 1964 Summer Olympics.

References

1938 births
Living people
Athletes (track and field) at the 1964 Summer Olympics
Tunisian male long-distance runners
Tunisian male marathon runners
Olympic athletes of Tunisia
Place of birth missing (living people)
20th-century Tunisian people